Manshiyat Khan al-Shih (Arabic: منشية خان الشيح) is a Syrian village in the Qatana District of the Rif Dimashq Governorate. According to the Syria Central Bureau of Statistics (CBS), Manshiyat Khan al-Shih had a population of 2,146 in the 2004 census.

References

External links

Populated places in Qatana District